Western Family Foods was founded as the Pacific Mercantile Cooperative on March 3, 1934, by a group of retailer-owned grocery wholesalers. Western Family Foods was established December 19, 1963. The company supplies independent grocery stores with store brands. It is based in Tigard, Oregon. It used to distribute the Western Family, Shurfine, Shursaving, MarketChoice, and Better Buy brands, which are used in many independently owned supermarkets. On June 13, 2016, Western Family Foods announced that they had been acquired by Topco and closed their Tigard office later in 2016.

References

 
 "'Enviro Green' line of foods introduced by Western Family". Lewiston Morning Tribune. May 5, 1990.

External links
 Western Family Foods web site

American companies established in 1934
Food and drink companies established in 1934
Retail companies established in 1934
American companies disestablished in 2016
Food and drink companies disestablished in 2016
Retail companies disestablished in 2016
Retailers' cooperatives in the United States
Companies based in Tigard, Oregon
1934 establishments in Oregon
2016 disestablishments in Oregon